Music Is Our Way of Life is the third studio album released by Full Flava, a production which included Rob Derbyshire and Paul 'Solomon' Mullings, assisted by back-up vocalist Tee.

The album was recorded in collaboration with the following female vocalists: Chantay Savage, Beverlei Brown, Kelli Sae, Carleen Anderson, Joy Rose, Donna Gardier, Hazel Fernandes, CeCe Peniston, and Dee Johnson.

Track listing

Credits and personnel
 Chantay Savage - lead vocal
 Beverlei Brown - lead vocal
 Kelli Sae - lead vocal
 Carleen Anderson - lead vocal
 Joy Rose - lead vocal
 Donna Gardier - lead vocal
 Hazel Fernandes - lead vocal
 CeCe Peniston - lead vocal
 Dee Johnson - lead vocal
 Tee - back vocal
 Rob Derbyshire - producer
 Peter Robinson - A&R
 Chris Judge - cover illustration
 wilsondesign.org - design
 EMI Songs/Universal Music - publisher
 Warner Chappell Music- publisher - publisher
 Peer Music/Copyright Control - publisher
 Campbell Connelly - publisher
 Carlin Music/Palan Music Publishing - publisher
 Sony Music - publisher
 Jobete Music/EMI Music Publishing - publisher

References 

General

Specific

External links 
 
 
 
 
 
 
 
 
 
 

2007 albums
CeCe Peniston albums